Pedro de Melo de Portugal y Vilhena (29 April 1733 in Badajoz – 15 April 1797 in Buenos Aires) was a Spanish soldier and politician, who served as viceroy in the Rio de la Plata.

Biography
He was a member of the Melo de Portugal family, a minor branch of the Portuguese House of Braganza. Pedro de Melo served in many military roles in Spain before moving to South America in 1770. He was designated as governor when the Viceroyalty of the Río de la Plata was created. He was member of the Real Audiencia and worked for the creation in 1794 of a Royal Counsel with viceroy Nicolás Antonio de Arredondo.

He was designated viceroy after the resignation of Arredondo, on 16 March 1795. He kept the main policies of previous viceroys: improve the streets of Buenos Aires, or fortified defenses for Montevideo, but he had to face Portuguese incursions on the Banda Oriental. He created laws to deal with the shortage of bread, improved the viceroyal residence, and received ships from the Pacific Ocean.

Pedro de Melo was interested in expanding the colonization towards the coastline of Patagonia, ordering Félix de Azara to design plans for that purpose. However, Pedro de Melo died before being able to futfill them.

Pedro de Melo died on 15 April 1797, still being viceroy. The Real Audiencia took power for a brief period, to prevent a power vacuum in the meantime that the news arrived to Spain and a new viceroy was designated. Antonio Olaguer Feliú arrived shortly after.

Notes

References 

 

1734 births
1797 deaths
Knights of Santiago
Viceroys of the Río de la Plata
Governors of Paraguay
Spanish generals